Theresianum is a name that is used for a number of institutions in several countries, including the following.

Austria:
Theresianum (or Theresian Academy), a private school in Vienna
Theresian Military Academy, a military academy in Wiener Neustadt
A high school in Eisenstadt

Germany:
A Gymnasium devoted to the humanities in Bamberg
A state-recognized all-day Gymnasium in Mainz

Romania:
A large building complex in the suburbs of Hermannstadt that was used in the forced migrations of 1754

Switzerland:
A high school for girls in Ingenbohl